Barbara Sattler-Kovacevic (born 19 July 1948) is an Austrian retired slalom canoeist who competed from the late 1960s to the late 1970s. She finished 18th in the K-1 event at the 1972 Summer Olympics in Munich.

References
Sports-reference.com profile

1948 births
Austrian female canoeists
Canoeists at the 1972 Summer Olympics
Living people
Olympic canoeists of Austria
Place of birth missing (living people)